Yak polo (or sarlagan polo) is a Mongolian variant of the sport polo. It is played on yaks instead of on horseback. 

Originally invented in the early 2000s as a tourist attraction, the sport is as of 2006 reported to have attracted a modest following in Mongolia. The Mongolian Association of Sarlagan Polo claims that the sport is booming, with four games a week being played in the summer of 2006.
In Pakistan, Yak polo is played in the Himalayas and Hindukush at Boroghil in District Chitral. The event is held in July every year and is sponsored by the Sarhad Tourism Corporation, Government of Khyber Pakhtunkhwa, Pakistan.

See also
 Yak skiing, another sport (or tourist attraction) involving yaks.

References
 

Polo
Animals in sport
Sport in Mongolia
Sports originating in Mongolia
Polo in Pakistan
Yaks